Bob Phalen is an American farmer and politician from Montana. He is a Republican member of the Montana House of Representatives for district 36.

Montana State Legislature

2020 State House of Representatives election

Phalen was uncontested in the general election, having received 4,728 votes.

References

Living people
Year of birth missing (living people)
Republican Party members of the Montana House of Representatives